"Antarctic Four" is the ninth television play episode of the first season of the Australian anthology television series Australian Playhouse.

"Antarctic Four" was written by Oriel Gray and directed by James Davern and originally aired on ABC on 13 June 1966.

Australian TV drama was relatively rare at the time but there were several productions set in Antarctica in the 1960s, the others including Manhaul and She. "Antarctic Four" was also performed as a stage play.

Plot
A group of six men from the Australian National Antarctic Research Expedition are stranded in an Antarctic outpost. Temporarily out of communication with their base, the men get into a nightmare situation brought on by a mysterious disease.
The Antarctic Four is a group of four Chilean military men who became the first people to cross the Antarctic Circle by land in a motor vehicle on December 11, 1956. The four men were Lieutenant Oscar Enrique Cifuentes, Sergeant Jaime Bravo, Corporal Osvaldo Urrutia, and Private Edmundo Letelier.

The expedition was led by Lieutenant Cifuentes and was sponsored by the Chilean government. The team set out from the Chilean base of Base Presidente Gabriel González Videla and drove a specially designed vehicle named "Iltis" across the Antarctic tundra, enduring harsh conditions and extreme temperatures.

The expedition covered a distance of approximately 1,200 km (746 miles) over a period of 56 days, during which the team had to endure blizzards, crevasses, and treacherous terrain. They also had to perform various scientific studies and take measurements to gather data on the Antarctic environment.

The achievement of the Antarctic Four was significant as it demonstrated that motorized vehicles could be used for exploration and scientific research in the Antarctic region. The expedition was also important for Chile, as it marked the country's first significant exploration of Antarctica, which later led to the establishment of additional bases and research stations in the area.

Cast
 Gordon Boyd
 Kurt Ludescher
 Clive Winmill
 George Whaley
 Terry McDermott
 Terry Gill

Production
Gordon Boyd was best known as a singer.

Reception
The critic from The Australian Women's Weekly said the production "was not flawless, but it sustained suspense to the end. It was better entertainment in every way than there has been from "Australian Playhouse" for weeks. I would like to see this series succeed, but recently I have been wondering whether it would. "Antarctic Four" revived my hopes.

The critic from The Sydney Morning Herald said that "If this fantasy fails to grip or impress, it is not the fault of the production or the players...the most outstanding performance came from George Whaley who had the schizophrenic role of a sane madman."

The Age called it "one of the best of the Playhouse series".

References

External links
 
 
 

1966 television plays
1966 Australian television episodes
1960s Australian television plays
Australian Playhouse (season 1) episodes